Raymond Kegeris (September 10, 1901 – August 14, 1975) was an American competition swimmer who represented the United States as an 18-year-old at the 1920 Summer Olympics in Antwerp, Belgium.  Kegeris won a silver medal for finishing second in the final of the men's 100-meter backstroke event with a time of 1:16.8.

References

External links
 

1901 births
1975 deaths
American male backstroke swimmers
Olympic silver medalists for the United States in swimming
People from Butler County, Nebraska
Swimmers at the 1920 Summer Olympics
Medalists at the 1920 Summer Olympics
20th-century American people